The translocated actin-recruiting phosphoprotein (Tarp) is a protein that may mediate the invasion of epithelial cells by Chlamydia trachomatis using a type three secretion system.

References

Phosphoproteins